Cambulo is a town and municipality in northeast Angola. The municipality had a population of 120,127 in 2014.

Administration
The town of Cambulo is the seat of a municipality of the same name in Lunda Norte Province. The district covers an area of 41.607 km² and has approximately 135,072 inhabitants (as of 2014).

The municipality of Cambulo consists of four communes:
 Cachimo
 Cambulo
 Canzar
 Luia

Sister cities
  Murça, Portugal

External links 
 Profile of Cambulo

References

Populated places in Angola
Municipalities of Angola